Colaspoides is a genus of leaf beetles in the subfamily Eumolpinae. It is one of the largest genera in the subfamily, containing over 260 species worldwide. It is an extant genus but there is at least one species, C. eocenicus, found in Baltic amber from the Upper Eocene of Russia, and the genus has also been reported from the Miocene of the Dominican Republic.

According to Flowers (2018), the Old World species of Colaspoides have morphological similarities with Beltia, which indicates that they must be eventually placed in a different genus or genera.

Species
The genus contains the following species:

Neotropical species:

 Colaspoides abdominalis Jacoby, 1900
 Colaspoides alcyonea (Erichson, 1847)
 Colaspoides amabilis Lefèvre, 1876
 Colaspoides amazona Jacoby, 1881
 Colaspoides batesi Jacoby, 1879
 Colaspoides bicolor (Olivier, 1808)
 Colaspoides cupreipennis Jacoby, 1890
 Colaspoides elongata Jacoby, 1880
 Colaspoides fasciata Lefèvre, 1875
 Colaspoides freyi Bechyné, 1955
 Colaspoides fulgida Lefèvre, 1875
 Colaspoides hlisnikovskyi Bechyné, 1949
 Colaspoides hypoxantha Lefèvre, 1885
 Colaspoides hypoxantha hypoxantha Lefèvre, 1885
 Colaspoides hypoxantha nisotricollis Bechyné, 1954
 Colaspoides igneicollis Lefèvre, 1891
 Colaspoides inedita Lefèvre, 1876
 Colaspoides itaituba Bechyné & Bechyné, 1964
 Colaspoides limbata (Fabricius, 1781)
 Colaspoides limbicollis Lefèvre, 1875
 Colaspoides marginata Jacoby, 1882
 Colaspoides mera (Germar, 1824)
 Colaspoides peruana Jacoby, 1879
 Colaspoides quadriplagiata Jacoby, 1882
 Colaspoides reticulata Lefèvre, 1876
 Colaspoides rufitarsis Lefèvre, 1875
 Colaspoides smaragdina Lefèvre, 1875
 Colaspoides tibialis (Germar, 1824)
 Colaspoides tibiella Bechyné, 1953
 Colaspoides unicolor Jacoby, 1879
 Colaspoides varicolor Lefèvre, 1878
 Colaspoides viridicollis Jacoby, 1878
 Colaspoides viridicornis Lefèvre, 1878

Palaearctic, Indomalaysian and Australasian species:

 Colaspoides acervata Lea, 1915
 Colaspoides ahmadi Medvedev, 2010
 Colaspoides amamianus Komiya, 1998
 Colaspoides angusticollis Jacoby, 1898
 Colaspoides annamita Medvedev, 2004
 Colaspoides annandalei Jacoby, 1905
 Colaspoides anomogastra Lea, 1915
 Colaspoides apicata Medvedev, 2004
 Colaspoides apicicornis Jacoby, 1884
 Colaspoides armata Medvedev, 2004
 Colaspoides bacboensis Medvedev, 2004
 Colaspoides bakeri Medvedev, 2006
 Colaspoides balyana Medvedev, 2007
 Colaspoides basilana Medvedev, 2006
 Colaspoides bengalensis Duvivier, 1892
 Colaspoides bicarinata Lea, 1915
 Colaspoides bicoloricollis Medvedev & Romantsov, 2014
 Colaspoides bicoloripes Medvedev, 2019
 Colaspoides bidentatus Medvedev, 2004
 Colaspoides biplagiata Baly, 1867
 Colaspoides bolmi Medvedev, 2010
 Colaspoides borneoensis Jacoby, 1898
 Colaspoides brancuccii Medvedev, 2004
 Colaspoides brevicollis Jacoby, 1898
 Colaspoides brunnea Bryant, 1957
 Colaspoides buechi Medvedev, 2008
 Colaspoides buonloicus Medvedev, 2004
 Colaspoides caledonica Medvedev, 2007
 Colaspoides cantonensis Medvedev, 2004
 Colaspoides cariniventris Lea, 1926
 Colaspoides cechovskyi Medvedev, 2016
 Colaspoides chakratongii (Chûjô, 1964)
 Colaspoides chapuisi Medvedev, 2004
 Colaspoides cheni Medvedev, 2004
 Colaspoides chinensis Jacoby, 1888
 Colaspoides ciliaticornis Medvedev, 2019
 Colaspoides ciliatipes Lefèvre, 1890
 Colaspoides circumdatus Medvedev & Romantsov, 2014
 Colaspoides clavipes Medvedev, 2004
 Colaspoides coerulescens Baly, 1867
 Colaspoides coerulipes Baly, 1867
 Colaspoides confusa Gressitt, 1957
 Colaspoides cognata Baly, 1867
 Colaspoides cognatella Medvedev, 2004
 Colaspoides cognatomima Medvedev, 2004
 Colaspoides complicata Lea, 1915
 Colaspoides costalis Medvedev, 2004
 Colaspoides crassifemur Tan & Wang, 1984
 Colaspoides crassipes Lea, 1915
 Colaspoides cuprea Baly, 1867
 Colaspoides cupreicollis Jacoby, 1908
 Colaspoides cupreoviridis Lea, 1922
 Colaspoides curticornis Medvedev, 2010
 Colaspoides curvipes Medvedev, 2004
 Colaspoides cyaneipennis Medvedev, 2010
 Colaspoides daccordii Medvedev, 2004
 Colaspoides dapi Medvedev, 2004
 Colaspoides diffinis Lefèvre, 1893
 Colaspoides dimorphus Medvedev, 2004
 Colaspoides doddi Lea, 1915
 Colaspoides dohertii Jacoby, 1908
 Colaspoides dongnaicus Medvedev, 2012
 Colaspoides elegans Baly, 1867
 Colaspoides elegantula Lea, 1915
 Colaspoides elenae Medvedev & Romantsov, 2014
 †Colaspoides eocenicus Moseyko & Kirejtshuk, 2013
 Colaspoides excavativentris Lea, 1926 (excaviventris?)
 Colaspoides fasciculata Lea, 1921
 Colaspoides feae Jacoby, 1882
 Colaspoides fedorenkoi Medvedev, 2012
 Colaspoides femoralis Lefèvre, 1885
 Colaspoides flavimana Medvedev, 2004
 Colaspoides fontis Jolivet, Verma & Mille, 2008
 Colaspoides foveiventris Lea, 1915
 Colaspoides frenchi Lea, 1915
 Colaspoides fulvicornis (Baly, 1865)
 Colaspoides fulvimana Jacoby, 1908
 Colaspoides fulvipes Lefèvre, 1889
 Colaspoides fulvitarsis Jacoby, 1899
 Colaspoides fulvus (Chûjô, 1935)
 Colaspoides fulvus Medvedev, 2015 (junior homonym of above)
 Colaspoides fuscoaenea Baly, 1867
 Colaspoides geminata Weise, 1908
 Colaspoides geniculatus Medvedev, 2004
 Colaspoides glabrata Jacoby, 1898
 Colaspoides glabricollis Jacoby, 1908
 Colaspoides gorbunovi Medvedev, 2010
 Colaspoides gratiosa (Baly, 1864)
 Colaspoides gressetti Medvedev, 2004
 Colaspoides haemorrhoidalis Lea, 1915
 Colaspoides hainanensis Gressitt & Kimoto, 1961
 Colaspoides hageni Lefèvre, 1887
 Colaspoides hagiangi Medvedev, 2004
 Colaspoides heroni Lea, 1915
 Colaspoides hoblerae Lea, 1915
 Colaspoides howensis Lea, 1915
 Colaspoides icterica Weise, 1922
 Colaspoides imasakai Komiya, 1991
 Colaspoides imitans Medvedev, 2004
 Colaspoides inconspicua Jacoby, 1896
 Colaspoides inornata Baly, 1867
 Colaspoides insignis Baly, 1867
 Colaspoides iridipennis Jacoby, 1896
 Colaspoides jacobyi Clavareau, 1914
 Colaspoides jacobyi Medvedev, 2004 (junior homonym of above)
 Colaspoides japanus Chûjô, 1956
 Colaspoides javana Weise, 1924
 Colaspoides kabakovi Medvedev, 2004
 Colaspoides kantneri Medvedev, 2004
 Colaspoides kasaharai Komiya, 1991
 Colaspoides kelantana Medvedev, 2019
 Colaspoides kimotoi Medvedev, 2004
 Colaspoides klimenkoi Medvedev & Romantsov, 2014
 Colaspoides kubani Medvedev, 2004
 Colaspoides laeta Medvedev, 2004
 Colaspoides laevicollis Lefèvre, 1887
 Colaspoides lamellatus Medvedev, 2004
 Colaspoides langbianicus Kimoto & Gressitt, 1982
 Colaspoides laosensis Kimoto & Gressitt, 1982
 Colaspoides laotica Medvedev, 2004
 Colaspoides laportei Baly, 1867 (laportii?)
 Colaspoides lateralis Jacoby, 1900
 Colaspoides laticollis Jacoby, 1900
 Colaspoides laysi Medvedev, 2006
 Colaspoides leai Medvedev, 2001
 Colaspoides lefevrei Jacoby, 1889
 Colaspoides lobatus Medvedev, 2004
 Colaspoides macgregori Medvedev, 2006
 Colaspoides malayana Jacoby, 1894
 Colaspoides malayensis Medvedev, 2004
 Colaspoides martini Lefèvre, 1885
 Colaspoides martini martini Lefèvre, 1885
 Colaspoides martini spinigerus Lefèvre, 1893
 Colaspoides medogensis Tan, 1989
 Colaspoides melanocephala Jacoby, 1908
 Colaspoides mentaweica Medvedev, 2003
 Colaspoides micans Baly, 1867
 Colaspoides microdentata Medvedev, 2004
 Colaspoides mimeta Lea, 1915
 Colaspoides mimica Medvedev, 2004
 Colaspoides mindorensis Medvedev, 2006
 Colaspoides minimus Kimoto & Gressitt, 1982
 Colaspoides minuta Medvedev, 1995
 Colaspoides mirabilis Medvedev, 2010
 Colaspoides miyatakei Kimoto, 1967
 Colaspoides modesta Baly, 1867
 Colaspoides modiglianii Jacoby, 1896
 Colaspoides montana Jacoby, 1900
 Colaspoides morimotoi Kimoto, 1967
 Colaspoides multicostata Medvedev, 2007
 Colaspoides napolovi Medvedev, 2012
 Colaspoides negrosana Medvedev, 2006
 Colaspoides nepalensis Kimoto, 2001
 Colaspoides nitidicollis Medvedev, 2010
 Colaspoides nigricornis Jacoby, 1884
 Colaspoides nigripes Jacoby, 1884
 Colaspoides nigritarsis Jacoby, 1885
 Colaspoides nigrotibialis Medvedev, 2004
 Colaspoides norfolcensis Lea, 1915
 Colaspoides obscuripes Medvedev, 2010
 Colaspoides okinawanus Komiya, 1991
 Colaspoides okumai Komiya, 1991
 Colaspoides olegi Medvedev, 2004
 Colaspoides opaca Jacoby, 1888
 Colaspoides ovalis Lefèvre, 1890
 Colaspoides paddis Aslam, 1968
 Colaspoides pallidicornis Tan & Zhou, 1997
 Colaspoides parrotti Medvedev, 2006
 Colaspoides parvidens Lea, 1915
 Colaspoides parvula Baly, 1867
 Colaspoides patrikeevi Moseyko & Romantsov, 2022
 Colaspoides persicariae Chûjô, 1956
 Colaspoides persimilis Kimoto & Gressitt, 1982
 Colaspoides philippinensis Baly, 1867
 Colaspoides picea Baly, 1867
 Colaspoides piceana Medvedev, 2004
 Colaspoides picipes Weise, 1908
 Colaspoides picticornis Lea, 1915
 Colaspoides pictipes Lea, 1915
 Colaspoides pilicornis Lefèvre, 1882
 Colaspoides planifrons Jacoby, 1900
 Colaspoides pleuralis Medvedev, 2010
 Colaspoides poeciloderma Lea, 1915
 Colaspoides polilovi Medvedev, 2010
 Colaspoides prasinella Medvedev, 2004
 Colaspoides prasinus Lefèvre, 1890
 Colaspoides prasinus occidentalis Medvedev, 2004
 Colaspoides prasinus prasinus Lefèvre, 1890
 Colaspoides pseudodiffinis Medvedev, 2004
 Colaspoides pseudofemoralis Romantsov & Moseyko, 2019
 Colaspoides pseudomodesta Medvedev, 2010
 Colaspoides pseudorufa Medvedev, 2015
 Colaspoides pulchella Clark, 1865
 Colaspoides puncticeps Baly, 1867
 Colaspoides punctipleuris Medvedev, 2003
 Colaspoides purpurascens Medvedev, 2015
 Colaspoides purpurata Medvedev, 2006
 Colaspoides quadripartita Baly, 1867
 Colaspoides quieta Lea, 1915
 Colaspoides rafflesii Baly, 1867
 Colaspoides rara Lea, 1915
 Colaspoides rectilatera Lea, 1915
 Colaspoides regalini Medvedev, 2004
 Colaspoides regularis Baly, 1867
 Colaspoides riedeli Medvedev, 2010
 Colaspoides robusta Baly, 1867
 Colaspoides rubra Medvedev, 2010
 Colaspoides rufa Gressitt & Kimoto, 1961
 Colaspoides rufipes Kimoto & Gressitt, 1982
 Colaspoides rufiventris Medvedev, 2006
 Colaspoides rufofulva Medvedev, 2004
 Colaspoides rugipennis (Motschulsky, 1860)
 Colaspoides rugipennis Lefèvre, 1893 (junior homonym of above)
 Colaspoides rugulosus Lefèvre, 1889
 Colaspoides sabahensis Medvedev, 2010
 Colaspoides sandakana Medvedev, 2010
 Colaspoides sarawacensis Medvedev, 2010
 Colaspoides sarrameae Jolivet, Verma & Mille, 2008
 Colaspoides sauteri Chûjô, 1956
 Colaspoides schawalleri Medvedev, 2010
 Colaspoides schulzi Medvedev, 2007
 Colaspoides sculpturata Medvedev, 2006
 Colaspoides semipicea Jacoby, 1895
 Colaspoides serratipes Medvedev, 2013
 Colaspoides seticornis Medvedev, 2004
 Colaspoides shapaensis Medvedev, 2004
 Colaspoides shuteae Medvedev, 2010
 Colaspoides siamensis Jacoby, 1905
 Colaspoides similis Lea, 1915
 Colaspoides simillima Baly, 1867
 Colaspoides simplicipennis Jacoby, 1885
 Colaspoides speciosa Lefèvre, 1887
 Colaspoides staudingeri Medvedev, 2010
 Colaspoides striatopunctata (Boisduval, 1835)
 Colaspoides suavis Lea, 1915
 Colaspoides subfasciata Medvedev, 2019
 Colaspoides sublaevicollis Duvivier, 1892
 Colaspoides submetallica Medvedev, 2010
 Colaspoides subovata Medvedev, 2004
 Colaspoides subtuberculata Medvedev, 2006
 Colaspoides suginoi Komiya, 1988
 Colaspoides sulawensis Medvedev, 2008
 Colaspoides sumatrensis Jacoby, 1884
 Colaspoides taiwanus Chûjô, 1956
 Colaspoides takizawai Medvedev, 2010
 Colaspoides tamdaoensis Medvedev, 2004
 Colaspoides tarsalis Lea, 1915
 Colaspoides tenenbaumi Pic, 1942
 Colaspoides tenuicornis Medvedev, 2010
 Colaspoides thailandicus Kimoto & Gressitt, 1982
 Colaspoides tridentata Medvedev, 2004
 Colaspoides trusmadiensis Medvedev & Romantsov, 2014
 Colaspoides tuberculata Baly, 1867
 Colaspoides varians Baly, 1867
 Colaspoides ventralis Medvedev, 2018
 Colaspoides venusta Lefèvre, 1889
 Colaspoides vietnamicus Kimoto & Gressitt, 1982
 Colaspoides violacea Baly, 1867
 Colaspoides viridana Baly, 1867
 Colaspoides viridimarginata Baly, 1867
 Colaspoides viridipennis Weise, 1923
 Colaspoides viridiventris Medvedev, 2010
 Colaspoides vitiensis Bryant, 1938
 Colaspoides vocki Medvedev, 2007
 Colaspoides volkovi Medvedev & Romantsov, 2014
 Colaspoides weisei Medvedev, 2006
 Colaspoides yunnanicus Medvedev, 2004
 Colaspoides zoiai Medvedev, 2004

Renamed species:
 Colaspoides malayana Medvedev, 1998 (preoccupied by C. malayana Jacoby, 1894): renamed to Colaspoides malayensis Medvedev, 2004
 Colaspoides pallidula Lea, 1915 (preoccupied by C. pallidula Jacoby, 1889): renamed to Colaspoides leai Medvedev, 2001
 Colaspoides piceus Kimoto & Gressitt, 1982 (preoccupied by C. picea Baly, 1867): renamed to Colaspoides piceana Medvedev, 2004
 Colaspoides purpurata Medvedev & Takizawa, 2011 (preoccupied by C. purpurata Medvedev, 2006) renamed to Colaspoides purpurascens Medvedev, 2015
 Colaspoides tarsalis Chen, 1935 (preoccupied by C. tarsalis Lea, 1915): renamed to Colaspoides paddis Aslam, 1968
 Colaspoides tibialis Lefèvre, 1875 (preoccupied by C. tibialis (Germar, 1824)): renamed to Colaspoides tibiella Bechyné, 1953

Synonyms:
 Colaspoides discoidea Lefèvre, 1891: synonym of Colaspoides viridicollis Jacoby, 1878
 Colaspoides fruhstorferi Jacoby, 1898: synonym of Colaspoides robusta Baly, 1867 
 Colaspoides imasakai yakuanus Komiya, 1991: synonym of Colaspoides imasakai Komiya, 1991
 Colaspoides opulenta Jacoby, 1900: synonym of Colaspoides fasciata Lefèvre, 1875
 Colaspoides paviei Lefèvre, 1890: synonym of Colaspoides rugipennis (Motschulsky, 1860)
 Colaspoides phalerata Weise, 1922: synonym of Colaspoides philippinensis Baly, 1867
 Colaspoides subrugosa Jacoby, 1908: synonym of Colaspoides bengalensis Duvivier, 1892

Species moved to Beltia:
 Colaspoides chanchamayensis Bechyné, 1950: now a synonym of Beltia weyrauchi (Bechyné, 1950)
 Colaspoides chiriquensis Jacoby, 1882: now Beltia chiriquensis (Jacoby, 1882)
 Colaspoides placidula Bechyné, 1950: now Beltia placidula (Bechyné, 1950)
 Colaspoides placidula angustomarginata Bechyné, 1953: now Beltia angustomarginata (Bechyné, 1953)
 Colaspoides turialbana Bechyné, 1950: now a synonym of Beltia chiriquensis (Jacoby, 1882)
 Colaspoides weyrauchi Bechyné, 1950: now Beltia weyrauchi (Bechyné, 1950)

References

External links 

 
 
 
 Colaspoides at insectoid.info
 Genus Colaspoides Laporte, 1833 at Australian Faunal Directory

Chrysomelidae genera
Eumolpinae
Beetles of Asia
Beetles of Australia
Beetles of Oceania
Beetles of South America
Taxa named by François-Louis Laporte, comte de Castelnau